

The Bootleg Brewery is a microbrewery in Wilyabrup, Western Australia, near Margaret River, and is set on 30 hectares (74 acres) of land beside a lake. It was established by Tom Reynolds as a retirement project in 1994 at a time when just two other pub brewers existed in Western Australia. Today, with an annual production of 125,000 litres (2006), Bootleg produces a range of beers including several award-winning varieties which are sold on the domestic and international markets.

Due to the fact Margaret River is more known for wine production, Bootleg Brewery claims to be "an oasis of beer in a desert of wine".

The Bootleg Brewery has won a variety of medals from the Australian International Beer Awards over the years.  The medals by beer are as follows:
 Sou' West Wheat: Bronze (1997, 2001-2004), Silver (2005, 2006)
 Tom's Brown Ale: Silver (2001, 2002, 2004, 2005)
 Settlers Pale Ale: Bronze (2003), Silver (2006)
 Raging Bull: Gold (1999, 2003, 2004), Silver (1997, 1998, 2002, 2005)
 Amber Light: Bronze (2002-2004)
 Wils Pils: Gold (2002, 2003), Silver (2002, 2004), Bronze (1997, 2001)

See also

Australian pub
Beer in Australia
List of breweries in Australia

References

Notes

Bibliography

External links 
 

Culture of Western Australia
Australian beer brands
1994 establishments in Australia
Australian companies established in 1994
Beer brewing companies based in Western Australia
Wilyabrup, Western Australia